The La Chaux-de-Fonds–Glovelier line is a  railway line in the cantons of Jura, Bern, and Neuchâtel in Switzerland.  The line was originally built by two companies, the Chemin de fer Saignelégier-La Chaux-de-Fonds and Régional Saignelégier–Glovelier, and has been owned and operated by the Chemins de fer du Jura since 1944.

Route

La Chaux-de-Fonds–Saignelégier 

The Chemin de fer Saignelégier-La Chaux-de-Fonds opened a line between La Chaux-de-Fonds and Saignelégier on 7 December 1892. The company merged with three other companies to form the Chemins de fer du Jura in 1944.

Saignelégier–Glovelier 

The Régional Saignelégier–Glovelier opened a line between Saignelégier and Glovelier on 21 May 1904. The company merged with three other companies to form the Chemins de fer du Jura in 1944.

Notes

References 
 

Metre gauge railways in Switzerland
Railway lines opened in 1892
1892 establishments in Switzerland
Transport in the canton of Bern
Transport in the canton of Jura
Transport in the canton of Neuchâtel